Chailly is a surname. Notable people with the surname include:

Cecilia Chailly (born 1960), Italian harpist, composer, singer and writer, daughter of Luciano and sister of Riccardo
Luciano Chailly (1920–2002), Italian composer, father of Riccardo and Cecilia
Riccardo Chailly (born 1953), Italian conductor, son of Luciano and brother of Cecilia